HMS Portland was a 50-gun fourth rate ship of the line of the Royal Navy, launched at Woolwich Dockyard on 28 March 1693.

She was rebuilt according to the 1719 Establishment at Portsmouth, and was relaunched on 25 February 1723.

She was present at Wager's Action a naval confrontation on 8 June 1708 N.S (28 May O.S.), between a British squadron under Charles Wager and the Spanish treasure fleet, as part of the War of Spanish Succession.

On 17 March 1709, Portland recaptured Coventry, which the 54-gun Auguste and the 54-gun Jason (1704) had captured in September 1704.

In July 1739 Edward Hawke, who later became the First Lord of the Admiralty, became the commander of Portland until 1743.

Portland was broken up later that same year.

Notes

References

 Lavery, Brian (2003) The Ship of the Line - Volume 1: The development of the battlefleet 1650-1850. Conway Maritime Press. .
 
Roche, Jean-Michel (2005) Dictionnaire des Bâtiments de la Flotte de Guerre Française de Colbert à nos Jours. (Group Retozel-Maury Millau).

 

Ships of the line of the Royal Navy
1690s ships